List of notable Nivkh (Gilyak) settlements in Sakhalin Island and the Lower Amur River. Prior to 1905 settlements are listed from north to south in their geographical categories with most settlement names in the Nivkh language or in the only know given Russian name.

Nivkh population in 2002

According to the Russian Census of 2002 most Nivkhs have lived in following districts: Ulchsky, Nikolayevsky of Khabarovsk Krai and Alexandrovsk-Sakhalinsky, Nogliksky, Okhinsky of Sakhalin Oblast. Some Nivkhs live outside of their native area in big citites of Khabarovsk, Yuzhno-Sakhalinsk and Poronaysk.

Nivkh settlements before 1905

Amur Estuary
Nikolaevsk
Lazatev

West Sakhalin Coast
Tamlavo
Ngyl'vo
Valuevo
Langry
Chingai
Pyrki
Pogibi
Uandi
Ytyk'
Viakhtu
Khoe
Tangi
Arkovo
Port Aleksandrovsk

Sakhalin Bay
Rybnoe
Visk'vo
Pomyt'
Nil'vo
Matnyr'
Ngyd'
Koibgervo

East Sakhalin Coast
Khankes'
Urkdt'
Pil'tun (island)
Kakervo
Kharkor'vo
Chaivo
Lad'vo
Tyrmyts'
Vachi
Mil'kovo
Tagry
Lub'vo
Lung'yo
Nappi
Ngamb'vo

Tym River
Yukyr'
Chkharvo
Slavo
Uskovo
Tymovo
Rykovskoe

Footnotes

References
Black, Lydia (1973) Nivkh (Gilyak) of Sakhalin and the Lower Amur. Arctic Anthropology. Volume 10 No.1 p. 94 
Shternberg, Lev Iakovlevich and Bruce Grant. (1999) The Social Organization of the Gilyak. New York: American Museum of Natural History. Seattle: University of Washington Press

External links
The Nivkhs from The Red Book

Nivkh
Lists of place names
Sakhalin
Khabarovsk Krai
Rural localities in Khabarovsk Krai
Geography of Sakhalin Oblast